Ke'Haan is a fictional character featured in comic books published by DC Comics. He is a very tall, well-muscled humanoid alien with reddish-orange skin, a partially bald head and three brown locks down the center of his head. Other distinguishing features include a pair of bull-like horns. He first appeared in Green Lantern (vol. 3) #49 (February 1994): "Emerald Twilight Part Two: The Present".

Fictional character biography

History
Ke'Haan of Varva past was formerly the second in command to Green Lantern trainer Kilowog. He was also the designated protector of sector 786. Together, he and Kilowog were the top trainers for newly appointed Green Lantern Corps recruits. Over the course of his life, he was regarded as the toughest teacher on Oa. However this tough training was noted for producing some of the toughest Lanterns found in the corps. When Sector 112 was without a Lantern, he took Kentor Omoto's daughter Laira under his wing. Within her, he found a kindred spirit and she became his prized pupil. Within the Corps, it became heavily implied and whispered that he and Laira were more than teacher and pupil despite the fact that he had a family on his native planet Indeed, they could often be found together on most of their missions.

Emerald Twilght
When the entity known as Parallax corrupted fellow Green Lantern Hal Jordan, the Guardians dispatched Ke'Haan and Laira to stop him from reaching Oa. The pair found themselves outmatched as Jordan, powered by rage and psychosis, tore through them. Surprisingly, despite his imposing figure, years of experience, and overwhelming strength, Ke'Haan was the first to fall to Jordan, while his pupil Laira, while still losing, fared much better in her attempts at stopping Jordan.

Return and death
Believed dead after his battle with Hal Jordan, Ke'Haan, along with fellow GLs Graf Toren, Laira, Kreon, Boodikka, and Tomar-Tu, was captured by the Manhunters and taken to the forbidden Sector 3601 to be used as energy cells for the planet Biot.

During this time, he was succeeded as Green Lantern of his sector by Turytt who was tasked to tell his wife and children of his demise. Turytt also swore to kill the one responsible for Ke'Haan's apparent death.

It is unknown how long they remained captive until Guy Gardner and Hal Jordan, now free of the Parallax influence, discovered him and his fellow Lanterns. He was freed from captivity by Jordan and waged all out war on the Manhunters. After defeating the Manhunters, the Lost Lanterns turned their rage on Jordan, who they still believed to be their enemy. They paused however when Jordan refused to fight back. Upon examining their surroundings, they discovered Lanterns long thought dead. Apparently the Manhunters had been abducting Lanterns for a long time.

The newly resurrected Lanterns would have been slain if not for quick teamwork which led to the destruction of Biot. When they returned to Oa, they were given heroes' welcomes, and Ke'Haan resumed his duties as Instructor to new Lanterns. He was also the one to warn Hal Jordan to stay clear of the Lost Lanterns, even though Jordan was the one that rescued them. It is unknown how his successor and family have reacted to his return.

When Parallax (Kyle Rayner) brought Hal Jordan to Qward, the entire Sinestro Corps attacked him. Amon Sur told Hal it was ironic that he was going to die despised and abandoned by the Corps. Ke'Haan then arrived on the scene with his fellow Lost Lanterns, saving Hal and stating "Despised? Yes. But never abandoned. The Corps don't abandon their own". The group then went underground, with Ke'Haan taking Boodikka, Laira, and Hannu to find Ion. Instead, they find the Anti-Monitor, who kills Ke'Haan, searing the skin off his skeleton in a single blast.

Blackest Night

Ke'Haan is one of the many fallen Lanterns to be risen from his grave on Oa to become a Black Lantern. He is one of the many Black Lanterns beginning a stand against the living Green Lanterns on Oa. During the conflict, he manages to impale Guy Gardner through the leg. His corpse is destroyed.

See also
Laira
Kreon
Boodikka
Tomar-Tu
Graf Toren
Jack T. Chance
Emerald Twilight

References

Comics characters introduced in 1994
DC Comics aliens
DC Comics characters with superhuman strength
DC Comics extraterrestrial superheroes
DC Comics superheroes
Characters created by Ron Marz
Green Lantern Corps officers